Thomas Basset may refer to:

Thomas Basset (judge), died , English judge
Thomas Basset (died 1220), English royal counsellor, son of the judge

See also
Thomas Bassett Macaulay (1860–1942), Canadian actuary and philanthropist